Und wieder 48 is an East German film. It was released in 1948.

External links
 

1948 films
East German films
1940s German-language films
Films set in Berlin
German black-and-white films
Films directed by Gustav von Wangenheim
1940s German films